Paul Brothers is a Canadian television personality, seen as a host and reporter on sports television station theScore. He began in national television on MuchMusic in 2006 as host of the show Going Coastal.

Brothers grew up in Bishop's Falls, Newfoundland and Labrador. He moved to Halifax in 2004 and then to Toronto in 2010. Brothers was the first ever winner of Gillette Drafted: The Search for Canada's Next Sportscaster, beating out over 3,000 hopefuls to gain a one-year contract at theScore and become a spokesperson for Gillette.

References

Canadian television sportscasters
People from Bishop's Falls
Living people
Much (TV channel) personalities
Year of birth missing (living people)
Canadian VJs (media personalities)